Charles Monroe Start  (October 4, 1839 – December 19, 1919) was a Minnesota jurist and a Chief Justice of the Minnesota Supreme Court.

Biography
Start was born in Bakersfield, Vermont, the son of Simeon Gould Start and Mary Sophia (Barnes) Start. His father was a farmer who also served in local offices including justice of the peace.  Start's younger brother, Henry R. Start, served as a member of the Vermont Supreme Court.  Charles Start was educated in Bakersfield and at Barre Academy, studied law with William C. Wilson, and attained admission to the bar.

Wilson joined the Union Army during the American Civil War.  In July 1862 he enlisted in Company I, 10th Vermont Volunteer Infantry, and he received a commission as a first lieutenant shortly after enlisting.  However, ill health caused him to resign his commission in December, and he left the unit while it was serving in Virginia.  In August 1863, Start married Wilson's daughter, Clara A. Wilson (1843-1924).  They were the parents of two children, one of whom, daughter Clara L. (1868-1950), lived to adulthood.  He moved to Rochester, Minnesota in 1863, and established himself in a law practice. In 1866, he formed a law partnership with Ozora P. Stearns.

A Republican, he served as Rochester city attorney beginning in 1864.  His subsequent offices included Olmsted County Attorney (1871–1879), Minnesota Attorney General (1880–1881), Minnesota District Court Judge of the Third District (1881–1895), and Chief Justice of the Minnesota Supreme Court (1895–1913).

Start retired from the court in January 1913 and was succeeded as Chief Justice by Calvin L. Brown.  Judge Start died at his home in Saint Paul, Minnesota on December 19, 1919. He was buried at Oakwood Cemetery in Rochester.

References

Sources
Proceedings in Memory of Chief Justice Start, April 30, 1920 - Minnesota State Law Library

1839 births
1919 deaths
People from Bakersfield, Vermont
Minnesota Attorneys General
Chief Justices of the Minnesota Supreme Court
Minnesota state court judges
19th-century American judges